La Dormition des amants is a Belgian novel written by Jacqueline Harpman.  It was first published through Éditions Grasset in 2002.  It won the Prix triennal du roman of the French Community of Belgium in 2003.

Plot
This is an historical novel set in the seventeenth-century. Maria Concepcion (queen presumptive) is the daughter of King Carlos of Spain. While she is trained for ascendency, Maria treats her small castrated slave, Girolamo, with great compassion and he gradually becomes her playmate and confidant. Together, they learn to read and write, and science.
 
In 1610, Henri IV was assassinated by Ravaillac. Édouard (a fictional king invented by the author) ascends the throne. Maria is to marry Édouard and become the queen of France. Girolamo comes with Maria to France and are inseparable; he even sleeps in a room next to that of the Queen. But their love is only platonic and can never become carnal.

Here we find a little myth of Tristan and Isolde.

References

Further reading

Marc Quaghebeur, Laurent Rossion, Entre aventures, syllogismes et confessions: Belgique, Roumanie, Suisse, P.I.E.-Peter Lang, 2003, 

2002 Belgian novels
French-language novels
Novels set in the 17th century
Éditions Grasset books